David Mota Veiga Teixeira Carmo (born 19 July 1999) is a Portuguese professional footballer who plays as a centre-back for Primeira Liga club Porto.

He began his professional career at Braga, winning the Taça de Portugal in 2021 and moving a year later to Porto for €20 million plus €2.5 million in add-ons, the highest transfer fee between two Portuguese clubs.

Club career

Braga
Born in Aveiro of Angolan descent, Carmo began playing for hometown club Beira-Mar and was in Benfica's academy from 2011 to 2013. Unable to match the physical strength of his teammates, he returned to his home district and joined modest Sanjoanense.

Carmo joined Braga's youth academy at the age of 16. On 18 August 2018 he made his senior debut in the LigaPro with their reserves, playing the entire 1–0 home loss against Estoril, and made a further 26 appearances as the season ended in relegation.

Carmo had his first call-up to the first team on 17 May 2019, remaining unused in a 2–0 Primeira Liga home win over Portimonense in the last matchday. He appeared in his first top-flight match on 17 January 2020, replacing Raul Silva at half-time of the away fixture with Porto and conceding a penalty shortly after which Tiquinho Soares failed to convert with the score at 1–0 for the visiting team (Matheus had previously saved one from Alex Telles), in an eventual 2–1 victory.

On 25 October 2020, in a 1–0 local derby win at Vitória de Guimarães, Carmo was sent off for a foul on Marcus Edwards; this prompted a melée in which one more player from each team was also shown a red card. He and teammate Fransérgio were suspended for three games, while opponent Jorge Fernandes was banned for two.

On 12 November 2020, Carmo extended his contract for two more years to 2025. He nearly joined Liverpool on a €4 million loan with an obligation to buy in the next winter transfer window, but manager Carlos Carvalhal convinced him to stay as the team also would not have been able to find a suitable replacement in that timeframe. On 10 February 2021, in the second half of a 1–1 home draw against Porto in the first leg of the semi-finals of the Taça de Portugal, he broke his leg following a collision with Luis Díaz, who was sent off after a video assistant referee review.

Carmo returned to action with the first team 375 days later, playing the entire 1–0 away defeat of Tondela. He scored his first goal for the club on 14 April away to Rangers in the quarter-finals of the UEFA Europa League with an 83rd-minute header, being unable to prevent elimination after losing 3–1 away and 3–2 on aggregate; for his efforts, he was named the domestic league's defender of the month in a run of six consecutive wins, including five matches without conceding a goal.

On 15 May 2022, Carmo was sent off at the end of a 3–2 loss at local rivals Famalicão for retaliating when struck by Riccieli. He was suspended for two games and the Brazilian for three, while also being fined €867 and €561 respectively.

Porto
On 5 July 2022, Carmo signed a five-year contract with Porto for €20 million plus €2.5 million in add-ons, which was the highest transfer fee paid between Portuguese clubs; the previous record was Rafa Silva's 2016 move from Braga to Benfica for €16.4 million. Owing to his sending-off for Braga, he missed the team's victory over Tondela in the Supertaça Cândido de Oliveira, as did a quartet of teammates given suspensions for insulting Benfica; he made his debut for the reserve team on 7 August as the Liga Portugal 2 season began with a 1–0 home loss to Covilhã.

Carmo made his first-team debut on 3 September, winning all aerial duels in a 2–0 win at Gil Vicente; four days on his maiden appearance in the UEFA Champions League, he played in a 2–1 group-stage loss at Atlético Madrid. After giving away a penalty in that competition against Club Brugge that manager Sérgio Conceição deemed unnecessary and childish, he was completely ostracised; his 106-day exile ended on 12 February 2023, as a last-minute substitute in a 2–1 win at Sporting CP.

International career
Carmo represented Portugal at under-19 and under-20 level. He started the 2018 UEFA European Under-19 Championship on the bench, but after Diogo Queirós was sent off against Italy in the group stage he never lost his place again, making four appearances for the champions in Finland.

Carmo was called up to the senior side by manager Fernando Santos on 20 May 2022, for the 2022–23 UEFA Nations League matches against Spain, Switzerland and the Czech Republic. In October, he was named in a preliminary 55-man squad for the 2022 FIFA World Cup in Qatar.

Style of play
Carmo is predominantly left-footed, and his size is a significant factor in his defensive style and ability. He is a front-foot defender that engages in both ground and aerial duels, seeking to cut out danger at source by stepping in to intercept passes or muscle attackers off the ball. His physicality enables him to be a dominant presence, especially in the air.

Carmo also possesses quality in possession. His long-range distribution is one of the main features of his skillset, as he is adept at pinging switch passes to the opposite wing or driving a pass down the channel.

Career statistics

Club

Honours
Braga
Taça de Portugal: 2020–21

Portugal U19
UEFA European Under-19 Championship: 2018

Individual
Primeira Liga Defender of the Month: April 2022

References

External links

1999 births
Living people
People from Aveiro, Portugal
Portuguese sportspeople of Angolan descent
Sportspeople from Aveiro District
Portuguese footballers
Association football defenders
Primeira Liga players
Liga Portugal 2 players
Campeonato de Portugal (league) players
S.C. Braga B players
S.C. Braga players
FC Porto B players
FC Porto players
Portugal youth international footballers